Yellanur is a village in Anantapur district of the Indian state of Andhra Pradesh. It is the mandal headquarters of Yellanur mandal in Anantapur revenue division. It is located 75.4 km distance from its district main city Anantapur and 420 km distance from state's capital Amaravati.

Geography 
Chitravathi river flows across the village. The soil is black. The main crops are oranges, paddy, ground nut, cotton, red gram, chickpea, sunflower seeds, and jowar.

Demographics 
The population of Yellanur Mandal is 33,739 living in 7,840 houses, spread across 40 villages and 21 panchayats. SSVM school is well known education centre present in Pedda Mallepalle village. Males are 17,244 and females are 16,495. Krishnapuram, Kondapuram, Kacharlakunta and Venkatadri Palli are the smallest villages.

Panchayats 
The following is the list of village panchayats in Yellanur mandal.

•THIRUMALAPURAM
•NITTURU
•BOPPEPALLE
•BUKKAPURAM
•CHILAMAKUR
•CHINTHAKAYAMANDA
•DANTHALAPALLI
•GODDUMARRI
•JANGAMPALLI (Venkatadri Palli comes under this)
•KALLURU
•KUCHIVARIPALLE
•MALLAGUNDLA
•MEDUKURTHY
•NERJAMPALLE
•PATHAPALLE(Kacharlakunta comes under this)
•PEDDAMALLEPALLE(PM Kondapuram comes under this)
•SINGAVARAM
•THIMMAMPALLE
•VEMULAPALLE
•VENKATAMPALLE
•VENNAPUSAPALLE
•YELLANUR (Krishnapuram comes under this panchayat)

References 

Villages in Anantapur district
Mandal headquarters in Anantapur district